Alan Powell Goffe (1920-1966) was a British pathologist whose research contributed to the development and improvement of vaccines, most notably the polio and measles vaccines. He was a Fellow of the Royal Microscopical Society, a Fellow of the Royal Society of Medicine and a member of the Pathological Society of Great Britain and Ireland. At the time of his death he was the head of the Department of Experimental Cytology at the Wellcome Research Laboratories.

Education 
Goffe was born in 1920 to a black Jamaican father and a white English mother, who were both practising physicians. After attending Epsom College in Surrey, England,  Goffe graduated in 1944 from University College Hospital with a medical degree.  Goffe then specialised in pathology, first as a Pathological Assistant at the London Hospital and then at the Central Public Health Laboratory, taking some time out from the latter to complete a Diploma in Bacteriology at the London School of Hygiene and Tropical Medicine.

Career 
During his two years serving as Specialist in Pathology in the Royal Army Medical Corps, some of which was spent in Egypt, he turned his focus to intestinal pathogens such as typhoid.

Once his national service had been completed, Goffe returned to the Central Public Health Laboratory, where he studied the poliomyelitis virus and helped to introduce cutting-edge techniques developed by Enders in the US to the UK. He set up a tissue-culture laboratory; worked on preparing inactivated versions of the virus; and was a member of a Medical Research Council (United Kingdom) committee aiming to bring learning from the US to develop a vaccine in Britain.

In 1955 Goffe moved to the Wellcome Research Laboratories in Kent, where he worked as the Chief Medical Virologist. During his time at Wellcome he made important contributions not only to poliomyelitis vaccines, but also led on the development of an attenuated measles strain known as the "Beckenham" (also sometimes known as the "Goffe") strain. Goffe was involved in numerous clinical trials to test vaccines, publicly testing them on himself and his family to demonstrate his confidence in their safety. His interest in how some viruses could cause tumours led him to study the SV40 virus and the human wart virus, human papillomavirus.

Two years before his death he was given the task of setting up a new Department of Experimental Cytology, unusual in that it was the first department dedicated to fundamental research at the Wellcome Laboratories.

Personal life 
Goffe and his wife Elisabeth, who was a teacher, married in 1943 and had five children. Their son Hugh died from bone cancer aged 15, after which they set up the Hugh Goffe Foundation in his memory. At the age of 46 Goffe was drowned in an accident whilst sailing near the Isle of Wight.

References 

1920 births
1966 deaths
British pathologists
British expatriates in Egypt
People educated at Epsom College
Deaths by drowning in the United Kingdom
20th-century British medical doctors
British people of Jamaican descent
Vaccinologists
People from Kingston, Jamaica
Black British people in health professions